Juan Cristián Campos Sallato (Punta Arenas, 31 August 1956) is a Chilean actor and director of theater, film and television.

Career 
He served as Chilean cultural attaché in the city of Washington, a position in which he was appointed by President Michelle Bachelet (2006–2010).

He is the son of Javier Abraham Campos Pastor and Sara Sallato Pouchucq, studied at the School of Theater of the Pontificia Universidad Católica de Chile. He participated in several commercials between 1977 and 1980, where he was the leading figure in the soft drink Pepsi. He acted in the first Chilean version of the rock opera Jesus Christ Superstar in 1981. Then he debuted in telenovelas in the classic La madrastra (1981), in which he stood out with his character as "Greco", a teacher famous for his stuttering. He has played many main roles, the most remembered is Chronicle of a Holy Man in 1990, where he played Alberto Hurtado, a Chilean Jesuit saint priest and in 2005 he participated in the production Alberto: Who knows how much it costs to make a buttonhole?.

Campos has been established as one of the most successful actors in television for the last 40 years. After La madrastra, he acted in many successful productions such as Los títeres (1984), Ángel Malo (1986), Amor a domicilio (1995), Adrenalina (1996), Playa salvaje (1997), Marparaíso (1998), Cerro alegre (1999), and many more. In 2003, he starred in Machos where his role was the eldest son of Ángel Mercader, Alonso, who falls in love with the sweet and beautiful Sonia (Carolina Arregui), who had been the lover of his father for more than 10 years.

In 2010, he recorded for Channel 13 the TV series Feroz, which marked his return to telenovelas, where he played Guillermo. After almost 40 years in Canal 13, he signed for Mega in 2020.

He is married to fellow actress María José Prieto since 2009, and was married to Claudia di Girolamo from 1984 to 1995.

Filmography

Films

Telenovelas

TV Series

References

1956 births
Living people
Chilean male film actors
Chilean male television actors